Jamshid Maharramov (born 4 August 1983) is a former Azerbaijani footballer who played as a midfielder.

Career

Club
In August 2013, Maharramov signed for Ravan Baku from Kəpəz, moving to Adanaspor in January 2015.

Match-fixing allegations
In 2017, Maharramov was suspended for life from professional football by the AFFA for alleged involvement in match fixing. In December 2019, Maharramov was arrested in relation to the match fixing allegations.

Career statistics

International

References

External links

1983 births
Living people
People from Agdam
Azerbaijani footballers
Azerbaijan international footballers
Azerbaijani expatriate footballers
Expatriate footballers in Turkey
Azerbaijani expatriate sportspeople in Turkey
FK Karvan players
FC Baku players
Ravan Baku FC players
Adanaspor footballers
Azerbaijan Premier League players
TFF First League players
Association football midfielders
Sportspeople from Agdam
Footballers from Agdam